Opaz or OPAZ may refer to:

Public Authority for Special Economic Zones and Free Zones (OPAZ), government body in Oman
Opaz, character in 2003 French-Canadian film Kaena: The Prophecy
Opaz junction on Ontario Northland Railway, Canada
Opaz studio, recording studio in London used by The Quakes
Opaz Turkish music ensemble with whom Charlie Cawood performs
Opaz Back from the Raggedy Edges, 1994 album featuring Mica Paris